God and the FBI, provisionally titled In Dog Years I'm Dead, is the seventeenth studio album by American singer-songwriter Janis Ian, originally released in 2000 by Windham Hill Records. The album's ultimate title, and the theme of its opening title song, dates from a decade before its release when Ian requested that the FBI files of her parents, who were passionate black civil rights activists, be released to her.

At the time of God and the FBI'''s making, Ian thought this would be her final album because of poor record sales since her return to recording in the middle 1990s, and her realisation that she could not survive upon playing benefit concerts for causes like Zero Population Growth.

Consequently, Ian abandoned the commercial pretensions of previous releases, doing a large portion of the sessions in-house rather than in a studio, and doing ten songs with a single band. Ian did, however, return to working with co-producer John Jennings, who had produced her 1995 album Revenge'', whilst one song, "Memphis" was a duet with Willie Nelson and featured a lead guitar by Chet Atkins.

Track listing

Personnel
 Tina Abato – photography
 Larry Greenhill – engineer
 Robert Haynes – engineer
 John Jennings – producer
 Glenn Meadows – mastering
 Sonny Mediana – art direction
 Dave Sinko – engineer

Musicians
 Janis Ian – vocals, backing vocals, electric guitar, acoustic guitar, upright bass, keyboards
 Philip Clark – electric guitar, acoustic guitar, drums, backing vocals
 Jim Cregan – electric guitar, acoustic guitar, backing vocals
 Marc Moreau – electric guitar, acoustic guitar, backing vocals, engineer
 Willie Weeks – bass guitar

Guest musicians on "Memphis"
 Willie Nelson – co-lead vocals
 Chet Atkins – lead guitar
 John Cowan – backing vocals
 Steve Gadd – drums
 Matt Rollings – piano

References

2000 albums
Janis Ian albums
Windham Hill Records albums